William Russell, 8th Duke of Bedford (1 July 1809 – 27 May 1872) was a British Whig politician. He was the son of Francis Russell, 7th Duke of Bedford and his wife Anna Maria Stanhope.

Russell was educated at Eton College and Christ Church, Oxford and was member of parliament (MP) for Tavistock (which had been represented by members of the Russell family intermittently since 1640) from 1832 to 1841.

He died in 1872, aged 62, unmarried and childless and was buried in the 'Bedford Chapel' at St. Michael's Church, Chenies, Buckinghamshire. His titles passed to his cousin, Francis Hastings Russell, 9th Duke of Bedford.

References

External links 
 

1809 births
1872 deaths
408
Russell, Lord William|Russell, Lord William
UK MPs 1832–1835
Bedford, D8
People educated at Eton College
Alumni of Christ Church, Oxford
W
Whig (British political party) MPs for English constituencies